Richard Frank Cebull (born March 18, 1944) is a former United States district judge of the United States District Court for the District of Montana.

Early life and career

Born in Billings, Montana, and raised in Roundup, Montana,  Cebull received his Bachelor of Science from Montana State University (1966) and his Juris Doctor from the University of Montana Law School (1969). He was in private practice in Montana (1969–97) and a Trial Judge of the Northern Cheyenne Tribal Court (1970–72).

Federal judicial service

Cebull served as a United States magistrate judge for the District of Montana from 1998 to 2001. On May 17, 2001, Cebull was nominated by President George W. Bush to a seat on the United States District Court for the District of Montana vacated by Jack D. Shanstrom. Cebull was confirmed by the United States Senate on July 20, 2001, and received his commission on July 25, 2001. He became chief judge in 2008.

In a 2002 case brought by natural beef producers, the Charter family, against the United States Department of Agriculture, Cebull upheld the constitutionality of the Beef Promotion and Research Act of 1985, a government-mandated commodity checkoff program for the United States beef industry. The Charter family objected to being forced to pay into the fund, thus associated against their will with political and economic positions taken by the National Cattlemen’s Beef Association, the primary checkoff contractor. Cebull ruled that "The federal government created and controls the beef checkoff program. … Because the government may utilize private speakers to disseminate content-oriented speech, the [Beef] Act does not violate the rights of free speech or association." The ruling was vacated and remanded by the Ninth Circuit in 2005.

In 2004, Cebull granted the Ranchers-Cattlemen Action Legal Fund and the United Stockgrowers of America an injunction against imports of Canadian cattle over concerns of a potential bovine spongiform encephalopathy outbreak. After rulings from the United States Department of Agriculture and protests from the Canadian government, the United States Court of Appeals for the Ninth Circuit reversed Cebull's injunction in July 2005.

Judicial misconduct and resignation
On February 20, 2012, Cebull used his official courthouse email address to forward to seven friends an email containing a racially charged joke about President Barack Obama. In the joke, "A little boy said to his mother; 'Mommy, how come I'm black and you're white?' His mother replied, 'Don't even go there Barack! From what I can remember about that party, you're lucky you don't bark!'" Cebull said he "didn't send it as racist," but rather "sent it out because it's anti-Obama." On March 1, 2012, Cebull initiated a misconduct complaint against himself with the Ninth Circuit and sent a letter of apology to Obama and his family. The Crow Tribal Legislature and a New York Times editorial called for his resignation or impeachment.

On October 4, 2012, United States Courts spokeswoman Karen Redmond said Cebull would take senior status March 18, 2013. Cebull took reduced caseload but still drew a salary and kept a staff. On April 3, 2013, it was announced that Judge Cebull would retire, concluding the misconduct investigation begun by his own self-report. He fully retired on May 3, 2013.
An investigation by the  Judicial Council of the Ninth U.S. Circuit Court of Appeals revealed that Cebull had sent hundreds of "racist, sexist and politically inflammatory" e-mail messages over four years.

References

External links

Memorandum of Decision, Proceeding in Review of the Order and Memorandum of the Judicial Council of the Ninth Circuit,  Committee on Judicial Conduct and Disability of the Judicial Conference of the United States, C.C.D. No. 13-01 (January 17, 2014)

1944 births
Living people
Judges of the United States District Court for the District of Montana
United States district court judges appointed by George W. Bush
21st-century American judges
Politicians from Billings, Montana
Montana State University alumni
University of Montana alumni
United States magistrate judges
People from Roundup, Montana